QRH may refer to:

 QRH, the Q code for varying frequency
 Queen's Royal Hussars, a British army regiment
 QRH, IATA City Code for Rotterdam Centraal railway station
 Quick Reference Handbook, a manual for solving technical problems aboard an airplane